Hope is a 1994 live album by South African jazz trumpeter Hugh Masekela.

Reception 
Richard S. Ginell of Allmusic wrote: "Now happily resettled in South Africa, Masekela assembled a seven-piece group there and recorded an informal guided tour of his life and repertoire live in Washington D.C.'s Blues Alley. The songs stretch over a period of nearly five decades and several countries and composers -- from an incantatory Alexandria township tune, 'Languta,' which he learned in 1947, to a fairly ordinary piece written by keyboardist Themba Mkhize in 1993, 'Until When.' 'Abangoma' starts the CD out on the right track, hearkening back to the early fusion of African music and jazz that Masekela was playing back in 1966."

Track listing

Personnel 
Hugh Masekela – flugelhorn, trumpet
Damon Duewhite – drums
Bakithi Kumalo – bass, vocals
Lawrence Matshiza – guitar, vocals
Themba Mkhize – keyboards, vocals
Remi Kabaka – percussion, vocals
Ngenekhaya Mahlanghu – saxophone, flute, vocals, percussion
Los Ballederos Hornas Africanos De Townsheep – backing vocals

References

External links 

1994 live albums
Hugh Masekela albums